Helvibis germaini is a species of comb-footed spider in the family Theridiidae. It is found in Brazil and Peru.

References

Theridiidae
Spiders described in 1895
Spiders of South America